William McIver (26 December 1876 – 10 April 1934) was an English professional footballer who played in the Football League for Blackburn Rovers, Stockport County and Darwen as a goalkeeper.

Career statistics

Honours 
Blackburn Rovers

 Lancashire Senior Cup: 1901–02

References

English footballers
Brentford F.C. players
English Football League players
Darwen F.C. players
Hartlepool United F.C. players
Southern Football League players
People from Whittle-le-Woods
1934 deaths
Stockport County F.C. players
Nelson F.C. players
Blackburn Rovers F.C. players
Blackburn Rovers F.C. wartime guest players
Tottenham Hotspur F.C. wartime guest players
1876 births
Association football goalkeepers